The tee (⊤, \top in LaTeX) also called down tack (as opposed to the up tack) or verum is a symbol used to represent:
 The top element in lattice theory.
 The truth value of being true in logic, or a sentence (e.g., formula in propositional calculus) which is unconditionally true. By definition, every tautology is logically equivalent to the verum.
 The top type in type theory.
 Mixed radix encoding in the APL programming language.

A similar-looking superscript T may be used to mean the transpose of a matrix.

Encoding
The symbol is encoded in LaTeX as \top.

See also
Turnstile (⊢)
Up tack (⊥)
Falsum
List of logic symbols
List of mathematical symbols

Notes

Logic symbols